Hydroginella marina is a species of sea snail, a marine gastropod mollusk in the family Marginellidae, the margin snails.

Description
The length of the shell attains 3.03 mm.

Distribution
This marine species occurs off Papua New Guinea.

References

 Lorenz F. & Kostin A. (2007). A new species of Hydroginella (Mollusca: Gastropoda: Marginellidae) from New Ireland, Papua New Guinea. Malacologia Mostra Mondiale. 57: 12

Marginellidae
Gastropods described in 2007